Manamoc is an island-barangay in the Sulu Sea, in the northeastern part of the province of Palawan in the Philippines. It is a part of the Quiniluban group of islands of the Cuyo Archipelago between the islands of Palawan and Panay.

Geography
Manamoc, like most of the islands of Cuyo, is of volcanic origin. The almost circular island has a diameter of about 1 3/4  mi (3.8 km) and has a total land area of 1,275 acres (516 hectares). It is surrounded by coral reefs and abundant marine life. A break in the reef permits boat to enter the lagoon in the southwestern part of the island. This lagoon has about 3 feet of water at low tide.

The highest point of the island is Mt. English which is about 220 m (721 feet) and is open for trekking.

Economy
The island is essentially supported by fishing, seaweed cultivation and farming.

Three miles northeast of Manamoc is the exclusive resort of Amanpulo, on Pamalican Island. Since its opening, a large percentage of the inhabitants has found work as employees in the neighboring resort. The establishment also provided the residents of Manamoc and the other neighboring islands with other means of livelihood like supplying some food products and materials for the resort.

Infrastructures
Seacology has provided solar energy system to provide power to the community's schools, barangay hall and medical clinic in exchange for an agreement to protect the marine area for 20 years.

There is cell phone service in the island provided by Smart with the tower located on Mt. English. The Zip code of the island is 5318.

Tourism
Tourism on the island is still developing. The island is for guests who love to commune with nature. It is popular with tourists from all over the world who hope to get off the beaten track and spend time with local people. Foreign tourists from the Pamalican resort who are curious about island community life are regular visitors.

The island is a good place for snorkeling. With the help of Seacology Germany, a non-profit organization with the purpose of preserving the highly endangered biodiversity of islands around the world, the villagers established a 267-acre Marine Protected Area around Manamoc in 2002.

There are only a few bars and restaurants on the island that cater mostly to locals.

People
, Manamoc has a population of 2,001. The island is clean, prosperous and well-equipped with educational facilities for children.

The main religion on the island is Roman Catholicism.

Weather
The weather is broadly regulated by the dry and windy Northeast monsoon from January to May, and the rainy Southwest monsoon from June to November, with a high probability for cyclones between August and November.

See also
 List of islands of the Philippines

References

Cuyo Archipelago
Barangays of Palawan